"" ("Oh, you dear Augustin") is a popular Viennese song, first published about 1800. It is said to refer to the balladeer Marx Augustin and his brush with death in 1679. Augustin himself is sometimes named as the author, but the origin is unclear.

Background

In 1679, Vienna was struck by the Great Plague and Augustin was a ballad singer and bagpiper, who toured the city's inns entertaining people. The Viennese people loved Augustin because of his charming humour in bitter times, and they called him  (Dear Augustin).

According to legend, once he was drunk and on his way home he fell in the gutter and went to sleep. He was mistaken for a dead man by the gravediggers patrolling the city for dead bodies. They picked him up and threw him, along with his bagpipes which they presumed were infected, into a pit filled with bodies of plague victims outside the city walls. Next day when Augustin woke up, he was unable to get out of the deep mass grave. He was shocked and after a while he started to play his bagpipes, because he wanted to die the same way he lived. Finally people heard him and he was rescued from this dreadful place. Luckily he remained healthy despite having slept with the infected dead bodies and Augustin became a symbol of hope for Viennese people.

The story, already rendered by the preacher Abraham a Sancta Clara (1644–1709), lives on in the song, which is still popular in Austria. The tune is nearly identical to that of "Did You Ever See a Lassie?", although "" is longer and more melancholic than that song.

Text

Use in other musical works

During the classical era the song was a popular theme for variations. E.g. the composer Paul Wranitzky featured it in orchestral variations, in variations for xylophone, strings, trumpet and drums, and as the trio to the menuetto of his Symphony Op. 33, No 3. Johann Nepomuk Hummel wrote S 47, WoO 2 – Variations for orchestra on "O du lieber Augustin" in C major. The clarinettist and composer Anton Stadler used it in his first Caprice for solo clarinet.

The tune appears quoted (recognisably, but in a dissonant context) in the midst of the second movement of Arnold Schoenberg's second quartet, written a month before the height of Schoenberg's marital crisis. An additional significance attaches to the quotation in view of the quartet being the work in which Schoenberg decisively abandons the traditional key-system and embraces consistent atonality.

A Scots song, "Did You Ever See a Lassie?" is set to the same tune:
Did ye ever see a lassie, a lassie, a lassie
Did ye ever see a lassie gae this way and that?
Gae this way and that way, gae this way and that way,
Did ye ever see a lassie gae this way and that?"

In Estonia there is a whole family of stereotypical melodies, probably originated from the Estonian bagpipe-tunes of the 17th century at the latest. The kinship of the Estonian bagpipe dance tunes with the Augustin melody is clear, although verification of origin, in one way or another, is impossible due to the lack of written material. The Estonian Augustin-melody family includes, for example; "Puusaluu" (from Kihnu island), "Las aga mede vana Mari tulla" (from Tori), "Nüüd algavad noodilood" (from Muhu island) etc. Nowadays there is also known among Estonians a toast song, that is sung before drinking: "Selle peale vanad eestlased võtsid üks naps" (And upon that, the old Estonians took a schnapps).

The melody is also the base for: "The More We Get Together" a traditional American folk song and popular children's song dating to the 18th or 19th century.

The melody is also used in "Fat Turkeys", a children's song sung during the Thanksgiving season in Canada and the United States. Lyrics are:

Oh, gobble, gobble, gobble, fat turkeys, fat turkeys;
Oh, gobble, gobble, gobble, fat turkeys are we.
We walk very proudly and gobble so loudly,
Oh, gobble, gobble, gobble, fat turkeys are we. 

Bing Crosby included the song in a medley on his 1961 album 101 Gang Songs.

It appears at the end of the song Spinning Wheel, written by David Clayton-Thomas and performed by Blood, Sweat & Tears.

The melody is also used in "Daar wordt aan de deur geklopt", a Dutch children's song for the celebration of Saint Nicholas Day.

See also
Beloved Augustin (1940 film)

References

External links 
 
 A version and its translation

German folk songs
German-language songs
17th century in Vienna
Street performance
Songs about musicians
Cultural depictions of folk musicians
Cultural depictions of Austrian men
17th-century songs

de:Marx Augustin#O du lieber Augustin
pl:Epidemia dżumy w Wiedniu (1679)#Lieber Augustin